The Ānāpānasati Sutta (Pāli) or Ānāpānasmṛti Sūtra (Sanskrit), "Breath-Mindfulness Discourse," Majjhima Nikaya 118, is a discourse that details the Buddha's instruction on using awareness of the breath (anapana) as an initial focus for meditation.

The sutta includes sixteen steps of practice, and groups them into four tetrads, associating them with the four satipatthanas (placings of mindfulness). According to American scholar monk, Thanissaro Bhikkhu, this sutta contains the most detailed meditation instructions in the Pali Canon.

Versions of the text

Theravada Pali Canon
The Theravada Pali Canon version of the Anapanasati Sutta lists sixteen steps to relax and compose the mind and body. The Anapanasati Sutta is a celebrated text among Theravada Buddhists.  In the Theravada Pali Canon, this discourse is the 118th discourse in the Majjhima Nikaya (MN) and is thus frequently represented as "MN 118". In addition, in the Pali Text Society edition of the Pali Canon, this discourse is in the Majjhima Nikaya (M)'s third volume, starting on the 78th page and is thus sometimes referenced as "M iii 78".

Summary of the Pali Canon version

Benefits
The Buddha states that mindfulness of the breath, "developed and repeatedly practiced, is of great fruit, great benefit." It fulfills the Four Foundations of Mindfulness (satipatthana). When these are developed and cultivated, they fulfill the Seven Factors of Enlightenment (bojjhanga). And when these are developed and cultivated, 
they fulfill "knowledge and freedom" (Bhikkhu Sujato), "true knowledge and deliverance" (Bhikkhu Bodhi), or "clear vision and deliverance" (Nanamoli).

Establishing mindfulness
To develop and cultivate mindfulness of breathing, a monk goes to the wilderness or forest, or to the root of a tree, or to an empty hut, sits down with crossed legs and the body erect, and establishes mindfulness in front or right there (parimukham), and mindfully breathes in and out.

Four tetrads
The Ānāpānasati Sutta then describes the monitoring of the breath, and relates this to various experiences and practices. Following the classification of the four satipatthanas, these experiences and practices are grouped into a list of sixteen objects or steps of instructions, generally broken into four tetrads. These core sixteen steps are one of the most widely taught meditation instructions in the early Buddhist texts. They appear in various Pali suttas like the Ananada sutta, not just the Anapanasati sutta. They also appear in various Chinese translations of the Agamas (such as in a parallel version of the Ananada sutta in the Samyukta-Agama, SA 8.10) with minor differences as well as in the Vinayas of different schools. They are as follows:

 First Tetrad: Contemplation of the Body (kāya)
“Breathing in long he knows (pajanati ‘I am breathing in long.’ Breathing in short he knows ‘I am breathing in short.’
Breathing out long he knows ‘I am breathing out long.’Breathing out short he knows ‘I am breathing out short.’
He trains himself ‘breathing in, I experience the whole body.’(sabbakāya).‘breathing out, I experience the whole body.’
He trains himself, ‘breathing in, I calm the bodily formation.’‘breathing out, I calm the bodily formation.’ (kāya-)
 Second Tetrad: Contemplation of the Feeling (vedanā)
He trains himself, ‘I will breath in experiencing joy.’(pīti, also translated as "rapture")He trains himself, ‘I will breath out experiencing joy.’
He trains himself, ‘I will breath in experiencing pleasure (sukha). He trains himself, ‘I will breath out experiencing pleasure.
He trains himself, ‘I will breath in experiencing mental formation.’ (citta-)He trains himself, ‘I will breath out experiencing mental formation.’
He trains himself, ‘I will breath in calming the mental formation.’He trains himself, ‘I will breath out calming the mental formation.’
 Third Tetrad: Contemplation of the Mind (citta)
He trains himself, ‘I will breath in experiencing the mind.’He trains himself, ‘I will breath out experiencing the mind.’
He trains himself, ‘I will breath in pleasing the mind.’He trains himself, ‘I will breath out pleasing the mind.’
He trains himself, ‘I will breath in concentrating (samādhi) the mind.’He trains himself, ‘I will breath out concentrating the mind.’
He trains himself, ‘I will breath in releasing the mind.’He trains himself, ‘I will breath out releasing the mind.’
 Fourth Tetrad: Contemplation of the Mental Objects (dhammā)
He trains himself, ‘I will breath in observing (anupassi) impermanence.’ (anicca)He trains himself, ‘I will breath out observing impermanence.’
He trains himself, ‘I will breath in observing dispassion.’ (virāga)He trains himself, ‘I will breath out observing dispassion.
He trains himself, ‘I will breath in observing cessation.’ (nirodha)He trains himself, ‘I will breath out observing cessation.’
He trains himself, ‘I will breath in observing relinquishment.’ (paṭinissaggā)He trains himself, ‘I will breath out observing relinquishment.’

Seven factors of awakening
The sutra then explains how the four tetrads are correlated to the four satipatthanas. Next, the sutra explicates how contemplation of the four satipatthanas sets in the seven factors of awakening, which  bring "clear knowing" and release.

In East Asian Buddhism
The Ānāpānasmṛti Sūtra, as the text was known to Sanskritic early Buddhist schools in India, exists in several forms. There is a version of the Ānāpānasmṛti Sutra in the Ekottara Āgama preserved in the Chinese Buddhist canon. This version also teaches about the Four Dhyānas, recalling past lives, and the Divine Eye. The earliest translation of Ānāpānasmṛti instructions, however, was by An Shigao as a separate sutra (T602) in the 2nd century CE.  It is not part of the Sarvastivada Madhyama Āgama, but is instead an isolated text, although the sixteen steps are found elsewhere in the Madhyama and Samyukta Āgamas. The versions preserved in the Samyukta Agama are SA 815, SA 803, SA 810–812 and these three sutras have been translated into English by Thich Nhat Hanh.

Related canonical discourses

Breath mindfulness, in general, and this discourse's core instructions, in particular, can be found throughout the Pali Canon, including in the "Code of Ethics" (that is, in the Vinaya Pitaka's Parajika) as well as in each of the "Discourse Basket" (Sutta Pitaka) collections (nikaya).  From these other texts, clarifying metaphors, instructional elaborations and contextual information can be gleaned. These can also be found throughout the Chinese Agamas.

Pali suttas including the core instructions
In addition to being in the Anapanasati Sutta, all four of the aforementioned core instructional tetrads can also be found in the following canonical discourses:
 the "Greater Exhortation to Rahula Discourse" (Maha-Rahulovada Sutta, MN 62);
 sixteen discourses of the Samyutta Nikaya's (SN) chapter 54 (Anapana-samyutta): SN 54.1, SN 54.3–SN 54.16, SN 54.20;
 the "To Girimananda Discourse" (Girimananda Sutta, AN 10.60); and,
 the Khuddaka Nikaya's Patisambhidamagga's section on the breath, Anapanakatha.

The first tetrad identified above (relating to bodily mindfulness) can also be found in the following discourses:
 the "Great Mindfulness Arousing Discourse" (Mahasatipatthana Sutta, DN 22) and, similarly, the "Mindfulness Arousing Discourse" (Satipatthana Sutta, MN 10), in the section on Body Contemplation; and,
 the "Mindfulness concerning the Body Discourse" (Kayagatasati Sutta, MN 119) as the first type of body-centered meditation described.

Chinese sutras with the core steps
The Saṃyukta Āgama contains a section titled Ānāpānasmṛti Saṃyukta (安那般那念相應) which contains various sutras on the theme of anapanasati including the sixteen steps.

Metaphors

Hot-season rain cloud
In a discourse variously entitled "At Vesali Discourse" and "Foulness Discourse" (SN 54.9), the Buddha describes "concentration by mindfulness of breathing" (ānāpānassatisamādhi) in the following manner:
"Just as, bhikkhus, in the last month of the hot season, when a mass of dust and dirt has swirled up, a great rain cloud out of season disperses it and quells it on the spot, so too concentration by mindfulness of breathing, when developed and cultivated, is peaceful and sublime, an ambrosial pleasant dwelling, and it disperses and quells on the spot evil unwholesome states whenever they arise...."
After stating this, the Buddha states that such an "ambrosial pleasant dwelling" is achieved by pursuing the sixteen core instructions identified famously in the Anapanasati Sutta.

The skillful turner
In the "Great Mindfulness Arousing Discourse" (Mahasatipatthana Sutta, DN 22) and the "Mindfulness Arousing Discourse" (Satipatthana Sutta, MN 10), the Buddha uses the following metaphor for elaborating upon the first two core instructions:

Just as a skillful turner or turner's apprentice, making a long turn, knows, "I am making a long turn," or making a short turn, knows, "I am making a short turn," just so the monk, breathing in a long breath, knows, "I am breathing in a long breath"; breathing out a long breath, he knows, "I am breathing out a long breath"; breathing in a short breath, he knows, "I am breathing in a short breath"; breathing out a short breath, he knows, "I am breathing out a short breath."

Expanded contexts

Great fruit, great benefit
The Anapanasati Sutta refers to sixteenfold breath-mindfulness as being of "great fruit" (mahapphalo) and "great benefit" (mahānisaṃso).  "The Simile of the Lamp Discourse" (SN 54.8) states this as well and expands on the various fruits and benefits, including:
 unlike with other meditation subjects, with the breath one's body and eyes do not tire and one's mind, through non-clinging, becomes free of taints
 householder memories and aspirations are abandoned
 one dwells with equanimity towards repulsive and unrepulsive objects
 one enters and dwells in the four material absorptions (rupajhana) and the four immaterial absorptions (arupajhana)
 all feelings (vedana) are seen as impermanent, are detached from and, upon the death of the body, "will become cool right here."

Commentaries and interpretations

Traditional commentaries

Pali commentaries
In traditional Pali literature, the 5th-century CE commentary (atthakatha) for this discourse can be found in two works, both attributed to Ven. Buddhaghosa:

 the Visuddhimagga provides commentary on the four tetrads, focusing on "concentration through mindfulness of breathing" (ānāpānassati-samādhi).
 the Papañcasūdanī provides commentary on the remainder of this discourse.

The earlier Vimuttimagga also provides a commentary on Anapanasati, as does the late canonical Pali Paṭisambhidāmagga (ca. 2nd c. BCE).

Likewise, the sub-commentary to the Visuddhimagga, Paramatthamañjusā (ca. 12th c. BCE), provides additional elaborations related to Buddhaghosa's treatment of this discourse.  For instance, the Paramatthamañjusā maintains that a distinction between Buddhists and non-Buddhists is that Buddhists alone practice the latter twelve instructions (or "modes") described in this sutta:  "When outsiders know mindfulness of breathing, they only know the first four modes [instructions]" (Pm. 257, trans. Ñāṇamoli).

Sanskrit commentaries
The Śrāvakabhūmi chapter of the Yogācārabhūmi-śāstra and Vasubandhu's Abhidharmakośa both contain expositions on the practice outlined in the Ānāpānasmṛti Sūtra.

Chinese commentaries
The Chinese Buddhist monk An Shigao translated a version of the Ānāpānasmṛti Sūtra into Chinese (148-170 CE) known as the Anban shouyi jing (安般守意經, Scripture on the ānāpānasmŗti) as well as other works dealing with Anapanasati. The practice was a central feature of his teaching and that of his students who wrote various commentaries on the sutra.

One work which survives from the tradition of An Shigao is the Da anban shouyi jing (佛說大安般守意經, Taishō Tripitaka No.602) which seems to include the translated sutra of anapanasmrti as well as original added commentary amalgamated within the translation.

Modern interpretations

According to Ajahn Sujato, the ultimate goal of Anapanasati is to bear insight and understanding into the Four Foundations of Mindfulness, the Seven Factors of Awakening (Bojjhangas), and ultimately Nibbana.

Different traditions (such as Sri Lankan practitioners who follow the Visuddhimagga versus Thai forest monks) interpret a number of aspects of this sutta in different ways.  Below are some of the matters that have multiple interpretations:
 Are the 16 core instructions to be followed sequentially or concurrently (Bodhi, 2000, p. 1516; Brahm, 2006, pp. 83–101; Rosenberg, 2004)?
 Must one have reached the first jhana before (or in tandem with) pursuing the second tetrad (Rosenberg, 2004)?
 In the preparatory instructions, does the word "parimukham" mean: around the mouth (as favored by Goenka, 1998, p. 28), in the chest area (as supported by a use of the word in the Vinaya), in the forefront of one's mind (as favored at times by Thanissaro) or simply "sets up mindfulness before him" (per Bodhi in Wallace & Bodhi, 2006, p. 5) or "to the fore" (Thanissaro, 2006d) or "mindfulness alive" (Piyadassi, 1999) ?
 In the first tetrad's third instruction, does the word "sabbakaya" mean: the whole "breath body" (as indicated in the sutta itself [Nanamoli, 1998, p. 7: "I say that this, bhikkhus, is a certain body among the bodies, namely, respiration."], as perhaps supported by the Patisambhidamagga [Nanamoli, 1998, p. 75], the Visuddhimagga [1991, pp. 266–267], Nyanaponika [1965, pp. 109–110], Buddhadasa [1988, p. 35], and Brahm [2006, p. 84]) or the whole "flesh body" (as supported by Bhikkhu Bodhi's revised second translation of the sutta [in Nanamoli & Bodhi, 2001, see relevant footnote to MN 118], Goenka [1988, pp. 29–30], Nhat Hanh [1988, p. 26] and Rosenberg [1998, pp. 40, 43]), and the commentary, which explains that the "body among bodies" refers to the wind element as opposed to other ways of relating to the body?

Modern expositions available in English
 
 
 
 Analayo. Understanding and Practicing the Ānāpānasati-sutta in "Buddhist Foundations of Mindfulness" (Mindfulness in Behavioral Health) 1st ed. 2015 Edition
 Buddhadasa. Santikaro Bhikkhu (Translator). Mindfulness with Breathing: A Manual for Serious Beginners. Wisdom Publications; Revised edition (June 15, 1988). .
 Bhaddanta Āciṇṇa. Mindfulness of Breathing (Anapanasati)
 Bhante Vimalaramsi. Breath of Love: A Guide to Mindfulness of Breathing and Loving-Kindness
 Thanissaro Bhikkhu. Right Mindfulness: Memory & Ardency on the Buddhist Path. 2012.
 U. Dhammajīva Thero. Towards an Inner Peace
 Upul Nishantha Gamage.Coming Alive with Mindfulness of Breathing
 Ajahn Kukrit Sotthibalo. Buddhawajana Anapanasati

See also
 Anapanasati (Breath Mindfulness)
 Metta Sutta
 Kāyagatāsati Sutta
 Satipatthana Sutta, also called the Four Satipatthanas
 Upajjhatthana Sutta
 Bhāvanā
 Bojjhanga (Seven Factors of Enlightenment)
 Brahmavihara
 Buddhist Meditation
 Mindful yoga
 Paṭisambhidāmagga
 Satipatthana (Four Foundations of Mindfulness)
 Samatha & Vipassanā

Notes

References

Sources

 
 

 Bodhi, Bhikkhu (trans.) (2000). The Connected Discourses of the Buddha: A Translation of the  Nikāya. Boston: Wisdom Publications. .
 Brahm, Ajahn (2006). Mindfulness, Bliss, and Beyond. Boston: Wisdom Publications. .
 Buddhadasa Bhikkhu (trans. by Santikaro Bhikkhu) (1988). Mindfulness with Breathing: A Manual for Serious Beginners. Boston: Shambhala Publications. .
 Buddhaghosa, Bhadantācariya (trans. from Pāli by ) (1999). The Path of Purification: Visuddhimagga. Seattle, WA: BPS Pariyatti Editions. .
 Bullitt, John T. (2005). Uposatha Observance Days. Retrieved 2007-11-06 from "Access to Insight" at http://www.accesstoinsight.org/ptf/dhamma/sila/uposatha.html.

 

 Goenka, S.N. (1988). Satipatthana Sutta Discourses: Talks from a Course in Maha-Satipatthana Sutta.  Seattle, WA: Vipassana Research Institute. .

 

 
 
 Nhat Hanh, Thich (trans. by Annabel Laity) (1988). The Sutra on the Full Awareness of Breathing. Berkeley, CA: Parallax Press. .
 Nyanaponika Thera (1965). The Heart of Buddhist Meditation: A Handbook of Mental Training based on the Buddha's Way of Mindfulness. York Beach, ME: Samuel Weiser. .
 Nyanasatta Thera (trans.) (1993/1994). The Foundations of Mindfulness (MN 10).  Kandy, Sri Lanka: BPS (1993). Retrieved 2007-11-07 from "Access to Insight" (1994) at http://www.accesstoinsight.org/tipitaka/mn/mn.010.nysa.html.

 Piyadassi Thera (trans.) (1999). Girimananda Sutta: Discourse to Girimananda Thera (AN 10.60).  Kandy, Sri Lanka: BPS. Retrieved 2007-11-06 from "Access to Insight" at http://www.accesstoinsight.org/tipitaka/an/an10/an10.060.piya.html.

 Rhys Davids, T.W. & William Stede (eds.) (1921-5). The Pali Text Society's Pali–English Dictionary. Chipstead: Pali Text Society. A general on-line search engine for the PED is available at http://dsal.uchicago.edu/dictionaries/pali/.
 Rosenberg, Larry (2004). Breath by Breath:  The Liberating Practice of Insight Meditation. Shambhala. .

 Sri Lanka Tripitaka Project (SLTP) (n.d.). Anapanasatisuttam (MN 118). Retrieved 2007-11-06 from "MettaNet" at https://web.archive.org/web/20160322191339/http://metta.lk/tipitaka/2Sutta-Pitaka/2Majjhima-Nikaya/Majjhima3/118-anappanasati-p.html.

 Thanissaro Bhikkhu (trans.) (1995). Ananda Sutta: To Ananda (On Mindfulness of Breathing) (SN 54.13). Retrieved 2007-11-06 from "Access to Insight" at http://www.accesstoinsight.org/tipitaka/sn/sn54/sn54.013.than.html.
 Thanissaro Bhikkhu (trans.) (1997). Kayagata-sati Sutta: Mindfulness Immersed in the Body (MN 119). Retrieved 2007-11-06 from "Access to Insight" at http://www.accesstoinsight.org/tipitaka/mn/mn.119.than.html.
 Thanissaro Bhikkhu (trans.) (2000). Maha-satipatthana Sutta: The Great Frames of Reference (DN 22).  Retrieved from "Access to Insight" at http://www.accesstoinsight.org/tipitaka/dn/dn.22.0.than.html.
 {{Citation | last =Thanissaro | first =Bhikkhu | year =2006a | title =Anapanasati Sutta: Mindfulness of Breathing (MN 118) | url =http://www.accesstoinsight.org/tipitaka/mn/mn.118.than.html}}
 Thanissaro Bhikkhu (trans.) (2006b). Arittha Sutta: To Arittha (On Mindfulness of Breathing) (SN 54.6). Retrieved 2007-11-06 from "Access to Insight" at http://www.accesstoinsight.org/tipitaka/sn/sn54/sn54.006.than.html.
 Thanissaro Bhikkhu (trans.) (2006c). Dipa Sutta: The Lamp (SN 54.8). Retrieved 2007-11-06 from "Access to Insight" at http://www.accesstoinsight.org/tipitaka/sn/sn54/sn54.008.than.html.
 Thanissaro Bhikkhu (trans.) (2006d). Maha-Rahulovada Sutta: The Greater Exhortation to Rahula (MN 62). Retrieved 2007-11-06 from "Access to Insight" at http://www.accesstoinsight.org/tipitaka/mn/mn.062.than.html.

 Wallace, B. Alan and Bhikkhu Bodhi (Winter 2006). The Nature of Mindfulness and its Role in Buddhist Meditation: A Correspondence between B. Alan Wallace and the Venerable Bhikkhu Bodhi.
 Wallis, Glenn (2005). "Present-moment Awareness with Breathing" and "How to Meditate," a translation of and commentary on the Anapanasati Sutta; in: Basic Teachings of the Buddha'' (New York: Random House, Modern Library, 2007). .

External links

Root texts
 Ānāpānasattisutta in Pali SuttaCentral

Online translations
 Mindfulness of Breathing, translation from the Pali by Bhikkhu Bodhi
 Mindfulness of Breathing, translation by Bhikkhu Sujato
Anapanasati Sutta: Mindfulness of Breathing trans. by Thanissaro Bhikkhu
"Anapanasatisuttam (MN 118): The Discourse about Mindfulness while Breathing," ed. & trans. by Anandajoti Bhikkhu (Sept. 2008) - includes both Pali (with notes on discrepancies between redactions) and English
"Mindfulness of Breathing (Anapanasati): Buddhist texts from the Pali Canon and Commentaries," trans. by Nanamoli Bhikkhu [& Bhikkhu Bodhi ed.?] (1952; 2007) - includes translation of relevant Pali commentaries.
"Ekottara Āgama 17.1: The Ānāpānasmṛti Sūtra"

Contemporary instruction
 "Breathing like a Buddha" by Ajahn Sucitto (2022)
 "Anapanasati: Meditation on the Breath," by Ajahn Pasanno (May 26, 2005).
 "Basic Breath Meditation Instructions," by Tan Geoff (Thanissaro Bhikkhu) (1993).

Majjhima Nikaya
Mindfulness (Buddhism)